Expresul de Ungheni is a newspaper from Ungheni, the Republic of Moldova, founded by Lucia Bacalu.

References

External links 
 expresul.com 
 expresul.wordpress.com
 Sumarul publicației „Expresul de Ungheni”

Mass media in Ungheni
Publications established in 2007
Romanian-language newspapers published in Moldova
Newspapers published in Moldova